Thomas March Clark (July 4, 1812 – September 7, 1903) was an American Episcopal prelate who served as Bishop of Rhode Island between 1854–1903 and Presiding Bishop of the Episcopal Church between 1899 and 1903.

Biography
Thomas March Clark was born at Newburyport, Massachusetts on July 4, 1812. He graduated at Yale College in 1831, studied theology at Princeton, and was licensed to preach as a Presbyterian in 1835.  He became an Episcopalian in the following year, and was rector of Grace Church, Boston, for seven years, afterward holding charges in Philadelphia, Hartford, and Providence.  In 1854 he was consecrated Bishop of Rhode Island, and in 1899, on the death of Bishop John Williams, of Connecticut, became Presiding Bishop of the Episcopal church in America.  His Reminiscences appeared in 1895; among his other works are Early Discipline and Culture (1852), and Primary Truths of Religion (1869).

He died in Newport, Rhode Island on September 7, 1903, at age 91.

See also
 List of presiding bishops of the Episcopal Church in the United States of America
 List of Episcopal bishops of the United States
 Historical list of the Episcopal bishops of the United States

References

External links

 Documents by and about Clark from Project Canterbury
 
 
 

American religious writers
People from Newburyport, Massachusetts
Yale College alumni
1812 births
1903 deaths
Presiding Bishops of the Episcopal Church in the United States of America
19th-century Anglican bishops in the United States
20th-century Anglican bishops in the United States
Episcopal bishops of Rhode Island